Sabancı Performing Arts Center is the performing arts center and conference hall of Sabancı University in Tuzla district of Istanbul, Turkey.

The late Sakıp Sabancı, Honorary Chairman of the Trustees of Sabancı University, had announced the opening of the Sabancı University Performing Arts Center, of which the official inauguration took place on Sunday, 6 June 2005, with a personally written letter of invitation, three days before he died. The Center began offering its performance series in April 2005.

Sabancı University Performing Arts Center aims to contribute to the rich cultural life of Istanbul, particularly to the city's Anatolian coast, and provide cultural and artistic services to the University's students and staff, as well as to all art appreciators in the region.

The Center's goal is to organize activities through which art appreciators of all ages and from all walks of life can interact with the arts, as well as to become a prestigious performing arts center renowned for the quality of its performing national and international artists and groups. The auditorium has a seating capacity of 912.

References
 Sabancı Performing Arts Center website

Theatres in Istanbul
Theatres completed in 2005
2005 establishments in Turkey
University and college theatres
Tuzla, Istanbul